Rose Cecilia "Rosie" Stancer (née Clayton; born 25 January 1960) is a British explorer and polar adventurer.

Youth, education, family 
Rosie Stancer attended Butterstone House School in Scotland and then Heathfield School, Ascot. She holds an honorary degree from the University of Essex and is a Fellow of the Royal Geographical Society.

She is the daughter of Lady Mary Cecilia Leveson-Gower (1917–2014) and Sir Samuel Clayton. Her maternal grandparents were Lady Rose Bowes-Lyon (an elder sister of Queen Elizabeth The Queen Mother), and William Leveson-Gower, 4th Earl Granville, naval commander, making her a first cousin, once removed, of Queen Elizabeth II. Her paternal grandfather was Brigadier-General Sir Gilbert Falkingham Clayton, British Army intelligence officer and colonial administrator. Both her grandfathers died before she was born.

On 9 July 1993, she married William Wordie Stancer, with whom she has one son. Her husband’s grandfather was polar explorer James Wordie. Her own grandfather, 4th Earl Granville, had polar ambitions too, but was deemed too tall.

Expeditions

McVities All Women’s Penguin Polar Relay 1997
In 1997, Stancer was one of 20 amateur women selected for a place on the first all women's expedition to the North Pole, The 'McVities Penguin Polar Relay'. A relay of five teams hauled sleds of up to 150 lbs across  of shifting pack ice in temperatures down to minus 40 °C. After 73 days, the final relay group made it to the North Pole.

M&G ISA South Pole Expedition 1999
In 1999, Stancer and four others from the first expedition organised and managed their own expedition to the South Pole, The 'M&G ISA Challenge'. Without guides, and with one re-supply, they completed the  journey from the edge of Antarctica to the South Pole in 61 days. Meteorological data was gathered en route and submitted to the Omega Foundation.

Snickers South Pole Solo 2004
In the Austral summer of 2003–4, Stancer skied solo and without re-supply to the South Pole on the 'Snickers South Pole Solo 2004' expedition. During the expedition Stancer gathered both meteorological and physiological data.

Mars North Pole Solo 2007
In 2007, Stancer attempted to become the first woman to trek solo to the Geographic North Pole. She battled record weather conditions and had to self-amputate two of her frostbitten toes. At the final resupply with 89 nautical miles left, she made the difficult decision to stop the expedition because her pilots would not be able to pick her up at the North Pole. Having traveled 426 nautical miles in 84 days, Stancer was still able to set the world record for furthest solo female expedition to the north. This attempt might be a “World Last”.

The Long Haul Expedition 2019
In 2019, Stancer joined Mike Laird on concurrent solo expeditions across Siberia’s Lake Baikal, the world’s largest, deepest, oldest freshwater lake. Pulling sledges and without resupply, they traveled solo across the ice using spikes and skis. They traveled in opposite directions, with Stancer starting from the south and Laird from the north. Their routes reached the most westerly, southerly, easterly, and northerly points of the lake, which had never been done before in one expedition. Completing over 700 km in 21 days, Stancer set the record.

Charities 
Stancer is an honorary board member for the charity Special Olympics GB, which seeks to provide sports training and competition in a variety of Olympic-style events for people with learning disabilities.

Awards 
Stancer was awarded an honorary fellowship from the Polar exploration society. She also received the Mirror award for bravery from the Royal Geographical Society and holds an honorary degree from the University of Essex and is Honorary Vice-president of the Scientific Exploration Society.

References

Other links
 

1960 births
Living people
British explorers
Explorers of Antarctica
Explorers of the Arctic
Female polar explorers
People educated at Heathfield School, Ascot
Fellows of the Royal Geographical Society